Russ Hunt (21 March 1911 – 30 September 1992) was a Canadian cyclist. He competed in the team pursuit event at the 1932 Summer Olympics.

References

External links
 

1911 births
1992 deaths
Canadian male cyclists
Olympic cyclists of Canada
Cyclists at the 1932 Summer Olympics
Sportspeople from Toronto
20th-century Canadian people